Two warships of Sweden have been named Sjöhunden, after Sjöhunden:

 , a  launched in 1938 and stricken in 1960.
 , a  launched in 1968 and sold to Singapore in 1997.

Swedish Navy ship names